The Almería Public Library is a public library located in Almería, Spain.

See also 
 List of libraries in Spain

References

External links 
 

Public libraries in Spain
Buildings and structures in Almería